The Carnoustie Challenge was a golf tournament that was played from 1983 to 1986. It was a 72-hole stroke-play event on the "Tartan Tour", the PGA in Scotland's schedule. Total prize money was £10,000. The event continued as the Daily Express Scottish National Pro-am, using the Burnside and Panmure courses as well as the championship course.

Winners

References

Golf tournaments in Scotland
Recurring sporting events established in 1983
Recurring sporting events disestablished in 1994
1983 establishments in Scotland
1994 disestablishments in Scotland